Signed to the Streets 3 is the third studio album by American rapper Lil Durk. It was released on November 9, 2018, by Only the Family, Alamo Records and Interscope Records. The album features guest appearances from Gunna, Future, Ty Dolla Sign, A Boogie wit da Hoodie, Kevin Gates TK Kravitz, Kodak Black, Young Dolph, Lil Baby, Lil Skies and Juice Wrld. The album debuted at number 17 on the US Billboard 200 in the United States.

Commercial performance 
Signed to the Streets 3 debuted at number 17 on the US Billboard 200 chart, earning 26,741 album-equivalent units (including 1,910 copies in pure album sales) in its first week. On May 17, 2022, the album was certified gold by the Recording Industry Association of America (RIAA) for combined sales and album-equivalent units of over 500,000 units in the United States.

Track listing

Charts

Weekly charts

Year-end charts

Certifications

References

2018 albums
Lil Durk albums
Albums produced by Young Chop
Albums produced by Southside (record producer)
Albums produced by TM88
Sequel albums